Donát Benedek Orosz (born 28 July 2002) is a Hungarian former professional footballer.

Career
Orosz represented Hungary at the 2019 UEFA European Under-17 Championship, where they reached quarterfinals. He also made one appearance at the 2019 FIFA U-17 World Cup.

Orosz retired from playing in January 2023.

Club statistics
Updated to games played as of 20 May 2021.

References

External links

2002 births
People from Kazincbarcika
Sportspeople from Borsod-Abaúj-Zemplén County
Living people
Hungarian footballers
Hungary youth international footballers
Association football defenders
Diósgyőri VTK players
Kazincbarcikai SC footballers
Egri FC players
Nemzeti Bajnokság I players
Nemzeti Bajnokság II players
Nemzeti Bajnokság III players